Blue Valley is a small town north of Kampung Raja, Cameron Highlands, Pahang, Malaysia. It is famous for Blue Valley Tea Plantation, a tea brand in Malaysia.

Cameron Highlands
Towns in Pahang